Villeneuve is a commune in the Ariège department in southwestern France.

Population
Inhabitants of Villeneuve are called Villeneuvais.

See also
Communes of the Ariège department

References

Communes of Ariège (department)
Ariège communes articles needing translation from French Wikipedia